Apuecla is a genus of butterflies in the family Lycaenidae. The species of this genus are found in the Neotropical realm.

Species
Apuecla maeonis (Godman & Salvin, [1887])
Apuecla picus (Druce, 1907)
Apuecla upupa (Druce, 1907)

References

Eumaeini
Lycaenidae of South America
Lycaenidae genera